Paweł Jaroszewicz (born 20 September 1985 in Świdnik), is a Polish heavy metal drummer. Jaroszewicz has played with such bands as Interior, Rootwater, Sinful, Vader, Hazael, Thy Disease, Crionics, Deivos, Nerve, Obscure Sphinx, Christ Agony, No Emotions, Hell-Born, Lost Soul, FS Projekt, Decapitated, and Hate. He now plays in Bartłomiej Krysiuk's version of Batushka, Soul Snatcher, and Antigama and is also the current live drummer for Nargaroth and Belphegor.

He is endorsed by Czarcie Kopyto Pedals, Meinl Cymbals, Tama Drums, Lime Ears in Ear Systems, Balbex Drumsticks, Red Case Drum Cases and Hesu Cables. He used to be endorsed by Paiste, Vic Firth, and DrumCraft drums.

Discography
Soul Snatcher – Pylons of Dispersion (2007, Redrum666 Records)
Hell-Born – Darkness (2008, Witching Hour Productions)
Rootwater – Visionism (2009, Mystic Production)
Vader – Necropolis (2009, Nuclear Blast)
Sinful – XIII Апостол (2010, MSR Productions)
Crionics – N.O.I.R. (2010, MSR Productions)
Vader – Welcome to the Morbid Reich (2011, Nuclear Blast)
Antigama – Stop the Chaos (EP, 2012, SelfMadeGod Records)
Antigama – Meteor (2013, SelfMadeGod Records)
Hate – Crusade:Zero (2015, Napalm Records)
Hate – Tremendum (2017, Napalm Records)
Hate – Auric Gates of Veles (2019, Metal Blade Records)
Batushka – Hospodi (2019, Metal Blade Records)

References

 

Polish heavy metal drummers
Male drummers
Living people
1985 births
Death metal musicians
21st-century drummers
21st-century male musicians